Tun Ahmad Sarji bin Abdul Hamid (16 September 1938 – 28 August 2021) was a Malaysian    civil servant who served as the 9th Chief Secretary to the Government from 1990 to 1996.

Background and education
Ahmad Sarji bin Abdul Hamid was born in Tapah, Perak on 16 September 1938. He was educated at the University of Malaya, the Institute of Social Studies, The Hague and Harvard University.

Personal life
He married Sagiyah Salikin in December 1962. They had five children.

Death
On 28 August 2021, Sarji died, aged 82, from COVID-19 complications at the Hospital Canselor Tuanku Muhriz (HCTM), Universiti Kebangsaan Malaysia (UKM) in Cheras, amid the COVID-19 pandemic in Malaysia. He was earlier confirmed to be COVID-19 positive and was later admitted for treatment at the HCTM's intensive care unit (ICU) since 3 August. He was buried at the Raudhatul Sakinah Bukit Kiara 2 Muslim Cemetery in Kuala Lumpur.

Honours

Honours of Malaysia
  : 
  Companion of the Order of the Defender of the Realm (JMN) (1975)
  Commander of the Order of the Defender of the Realm (PMN) – Tan Sri (1990)
  Grand Commander of the Order of Loyalty to the Crown of Malaysia (SSM) – Tun (2008)
  :
  Knight of the Order of Cura Si Manja Kini (DPCM) – Dato' (1985)
  Knight Grand Commander of the Order of the Perak State Crown (SPMP) – Dato' Seri (1990)
  :
  Grand Knight of the Order of the Crown of Pahang (SIMP) – formerly Dato', now Dato' Indera (1990)
  :
  Knight Grand Companion of the Order of Sultan Salahuddin Abdul Aziz Shah (SSSA) – Dato' Seri (1992)
  :
  Knight Commander of the Most Exalted Order of the Star of Sarawak (PNBS) – Dato Sri (1993)
  :
  Grand Commander of the Exalted Order of Malacca (DGSM) – Datuk Seri (1994)
  :
  Knight Grand Commander of the Order of the Crown of Terengganu (SPMT) – Dato' (1994)
  Member Grand Companion of the Order of Sultan Mahmud I of Terengganu (SSMT) – Dato' Seri (1995)
  :
  Recipient of the Meritorious Service Medal (PJK) (1966)
  Knight Grand Commander of the Order of Loyalty to Negeri Sembilan (SPNS) – Dato' Seri Utama (1995)
  :
  Grand Commander of the Order of Kinabalu (SPDK) – Datuk Seri Panglima (1996)
  :
  Companion of the Order of the Crown of Perlis (SMP) (1977)

See also

 List of deaths due to COVID-19 - notable individual deaths

References

1938 births
2021 deaths
People from Perak
Malaysian people of Malay descent
Malaysian people of Minangkabau descent
Malaysian Muslims
Malaysian civil servants
Chief Secretaries to the Government of Malaysia
University of Malaya alumni
International Institute of Social Studies alumni
Harvard University alumni
Knights Commander of the Most Exalted Order of the Star of Sarawak
Grand Commanders of the Order of Loyalty to the Crown of Malaysia
Commanders of the Order of the Defender of the Realm
Companions of the Order of the Defender of the Realm
Grand Commanders of the Order of Kinabalu
Knights Grand Commander of the Order of the Crown of Terengganu
Deaths from the COVID-19 pandemic in Malaysia